Various laws in the United States regulate the use of mobile phones  and other electronics by motorists.  Different states take different approaches. Some laws affect only novice drivers or commercial drivers, while some laws affect all drivers. Some laws target handheld devices only, while other laws affect both handheld and handsfree devices.

Regulatory laws
The laws regulating driving (or distracted driving) may be subject to primary enforcement or secondary enforcement by state, county or local authorities.  All State-level cell phone use laws in the United States are of the primary enforcement type—meaning an officer may cite a driver for using a hand-held cell phone without any other traffic offense having taken place—except in some cases involving newer (or "novice"), drivers.  In the case of secondary enforcement, a police officer may only stop or cite a driver for a cell phone use violation if the driver has committed another primary violation (such as speeding, failure to stop, etc.) at the same time.

A federal transportation funding law passed in July 2012, known as the Moving Ahead for Progress in the 21st Century Act (MAP-21), provided $17.5 million in grants during fiscal year 2013 for states with primary enforcement laws against distracted driving, including laws prohibiting cell phone use while driving.  States with secondary enforcement laws or no laws at all are ineligible to receive this grant funding.

Laws by state

No state bans all cell phone use for all drivers.  However, Arizona, California, Connecticut, Delaware, Georgia, Hawaii, Idaho, Illinois, Indiana, Maine, Maryland, Massachusetts, Minnesota, Nevada, New Hampshire, New Jersey, New York, Oregon, Rhode Island, Tennessee, Vermont, Virginia, Washington, West Virginia (plus Washington, D.C., Puerto Rico, Guam and the U.S. Virgin Islands) prohibit all drivers from using hand-held cell phones while driving.  Thirty-six states and Washington, D.C. ban all cell phone use by newer drivers, while 19 states and Washington, D.C., prohibit any cell phone use by school bus drivers if children are present.

Preemption laws

Often, local authorities pass their own distracted driving bans—most include the use of cell phones while driving.  Several states (Florida, Kentucky, Louisiana, Mississippi, Nevada, Pennsylvania, and Oklahoma) have prohibited localities from enacting their own laws regarding cell phone use.

Cost of distracted driving
A 2014 report from the National Safety Council, which compiles data on injuries and fatalities from 2013 and earlier, concluded that use of mobile phones caused 26% of U.S. car accidents.  Just 5% of mobile phone-related accidents in the U.S. involved texting: "The majority of the accidents involve drivers distracted while talking on handheld or hands-free cellphones."

The U.S. Department of Transportation  has established an official website to combat distracted driving, Distraction.gov.

In 2010, the State Farm insurance company stated that mobile phone use annually resulted in: 636,000 crashes, 330,000 personal injuries, 12,000 major injuries, 2,700 deaths, and $43 billion in damages.

In 2018, the National Highway Traffic Safety Administration released the following data - 2,841 lives lost due to distracted driving. Among those killed: 1,730 drivers, 605 passengers, 400 pedestrians and 77 bicyclists. The report clearly states, texting is the "most alarming distraction".

See also
Texting while driving

References

Further reading

Hazardous motor vehicle activities
Road safety
United States law-related lists
Vehicle law
Mobile phone culture